Ferhat Abdi Şahin (born 1967, Kobanî, Syria), better known by his nom de guerre Mazloum Abdi ( – ) and his previous nom de guerre Şahin Cilo, is a Syrian Kurdish military leader, serving as the commander-in-chief of the Syrian Democratic Forces (SDF). Various news articles have referred to him with the name "Mazlum Kobane."

Early life 
Ferhat Abdi Şahin was born to Syrian Kurdish parents in Kobanî around 1967. Trained as a civil engineer at the University of Aleppo, according to Turkish sources, Abdi joined the Kurdistan Workers' Party (PKK) within Syria in 1990 and was imprisoned five times by the Syrian authorities. While serving with the PKK in Syria, he became a personal friend of PKK leader Abdullah Öcalan. Abdi later conducted militant activities in rural areas of Şemdinli, Turkey in 1996.

He left to Europe in 1997 where he was engaged in Kurdish political work until 2003, when he traveled to Iraq where he was allegedly involved in military work. According to Turkish sources, he served as member of the PKK high command in 2005. Abdi became a member of the People's Defense Forces' (HPG) special operations board from 2009 until 2011/12, when he was sent to Syria by the PKK in order to organise the YPG's activities in Kurdish populated regions of Syria amid the then escalating Syrian Civil War.

Syrian war and Kurdish-ISIS war 
In August 2014, he was in charge of the negotiations the People's Protection Units (YPG) held in Sulaymaniya with Iran and the United States in order to form an effective alliance against the Islamic State of Iraq and the Levant (ISIL), after which an alliance with the US was agreed to.  Abdi defended Kobanî during the Siege of Kobanî (Oct. 2014-Jan. 2015), refusing to withdraw despite US recommendations to do so. When his family's house was taken a 3rd time by ISIS in house-to-house fights, and given the increased collaboration with USAF, he requested a strike on his home. As the commander of the SDF, Abdi commands 70,000 troops.

Peace building in the AANES 
Abdi has stated that he is open to work with the Syrian government within a federal system that includes the existing de facto autonomous region of Autonomous Administration of North and East Syria. On 29 June 2019 Abdi, as representative of the SDF, signed the action plan of the United Nations aiming to prevent the enlistment of child soldiers in the armed forces.

In the wake of the 2019 Turkish offensive into north-eastern Syria, Abdi has stated his willingness to work with the Syrian regime and Russia and to make compromises with them in order to protect the local population of northeastern Syria from potential "genocide" by "Turkey and its jihadi mercenaries. As part of a deal with the SDF, Syrian government troops have been given permission to enter the cities of Manbij and Kobanî in the hopes of deterring further Turkish aggression.

In October 2019, a group of US Senators suggested that the US State Department give Abdi a visa so that he would be able to discuss Syria in the United States. In response, the Turkish Minister of Justice Abdulhamit Gül criticized the US government for treating Abdi as a "legitimate political figure" and indicated that an extradition request had been issued so that if Abdi would enter US territory, he should be detained to be extradited to Turkey. As ninth upon the Turkish government's most-wanted terrorist list, Abdi has a 9 million lira reward offered by Turkey for help in his capture.

On October 9, 2019, US president Donald Trump wrote a note to Turkey's president Recep Tayyip Erdoğan, enclosing a note from Abdi, offering to mediate between Turkey and the YPG, saying Abdi was "willing to make concessions that they would never have made in the past" and enclosing a note from Abdi. During Erdoğan's November 14 state visit to the US, he returned the letter to Trump, and claimed Abdi was the adoptive son of the in Turkey imprisoned PKK leader Abdullah Öcalan. Erdogan also claimed to have presented Trump with CIA documentation classifying Abdi is a terrorist.

Notes

References

External links

Kurdish military personnel
Kurdish people
Living people
Syrian Democratic Forces
1967 births
Members of the Kurdistan Workers' Party